Rodolfo Hernández may refer to:

Rodolfo Hernández Suárez (b. 1945), Colombian businessman/politician, 2022 presidential candidate
Rodolfo Hernández (wrestler) (Rodolfo Hernández Vázquez, b. 1969), Mexican Olympic wrestler
Rudy Hernández (shortstop) (Rodolfo Hernández Acosta, b. 1951), Mexican baseball player
Rodolfo P. Hernández (Rodolfo Pérez Hernández, 1931–2013), United States soldier, Medal of Honor recipient
 (b. 1950), Costa Rican paediatrician, 2018 presidential candidate